Technology Happy Life (ThL) is a Chinese smartphone brand, part of Shenzhen Hongjiayuan Communication Technology Ltd., which sells its phones directly to customers rather than through a mobile network. This means that they are sold without being locked to a specific data provider (unlocked). As well as selling phones in China, their phones are also sold in many other countries worldwide, including Taiwan, India, European Union, Russia, the United States and Nigeria.

Products

Smartphones 
THL T9 MTK6737 Quad-core 64-bit 5.5" HD Android 6.0 4G LTE Phone 8MP CAM Touch ID 3000mAh
THL L969 (?)
THL ultraphone 4400 (?)5" HD display, Android 4.2, 4400mAh battery
THL 4000 (?) ''4.7" qHD display (960x540), Android 4.4.2, 4000mAh battery, 1GB RAM, 8GB Internal, SD-Card Support (up to 32GB), 5MP camera, 1.3Ghz Quad core processor, 3G support
THL 5000T (?)5" HD display, Android 4.4, 5000mAh battery

2013 
THL W11 (2013)5" FHD display, Android 4.2, 2000mAh battery
THL T5 (2013)

2014 
THL T5S (2014)4.7" qHD display (960x540), Android 4.2, 1GB RAM, 1.3 GHz 4-Core, 1950mAh battery 
THL T6S (2014)4 Core 
THL T6 pro (2014)5" HD display, Android 4.4, 1GB RAM, 1.4 GHz 8-Core, 1900mAh battery 
THL T100S (2014)5.0" FHD display, Android 4.2(upgradable to 4.4.2), 2GB RAM, 1.7 GHz 8-Core(Octacore), 32GB Internal,  Two 13Mpx cameras, 2750mAh battery
THL 5000 ultraphone (2014)5" FHD display, Android 4.4.2, 5000mAh battery
THL A3

2015 
THL T6C (2015)''5" FWVGA display (854x480), Android 5.1, 1900mAh battery, quad-core CPU @ 1.3 GHz, 1GB RAM, 8GB internal storage, SD card support, 0.3MP+8MP cameras, 2G/3G 
THL 2015A (2015)5" HD display (1280x720), Android 5.1, 2700mAh battery, quad-core 64-bit CPU @ 1.3GHz, 2GB RAM, 16GB internal storage, SD card support, 8MP+13MP cameras, 2G/3G/4G, 4G bands 1/3/7/20 
THL 2015 (2015)5" FHD display (1920x1080), Android 4.4.4, 2700mAh battery, octa-core 64-bit CPU @ 1.7GHz, 2GB RAM, 16GB internal storage, SD card support, 8MP+13MP cameras, 2G/3G/4G, 4G bands 1/3/7/20, fingerprint scanner

2016 
THL T9 Plus(2016)5.5" FHD display,Android 6.0 Marshmallow, 3000 mAh battery, Quad-Core @1.3 GHz ARM Cortex-A53, 2GB RAM, 16GB internal storage,SD card support, 8MP+2MP cameras, 4G LTE : 850 / 1800 / 2100 / 2600 MHz

2017 
THL Knight 1(2017)5.5" FHD display,Android 7.0 Nougat,3100 mAh battery,Octa-Core 4x 1.5GHz ARM Cortex-A53 + 4x 1.0GHz ARM Cortex-A53, 3GB RAM, 32GB internal storage, SD  card support, 13M+2MP(Rear)+8MP(Front) cameras, 4G LTE : 800 / 1800 / 2100 / 2600 MHz

2018 
THL Knight 2(2018)6.0" HD+ (1440×720), Android 7.0 Nougat, 4200 mAh battery, Octa-Core 4x 1.5GHz ARM Cortex-A53 + 4x 1.0GHz ARM Cortex-A53, 4GB RAM, 64GB internal storage, SD card support, 13MP+5MP(Rear)+8MP(Front) cameras, 4G LTE : 800 / 900 / 1800 / 2100 / 2600 MHz

References

External links
Official ThL website

Mobile phone manufacturers
Chinese brands
Companies based in Shenzhen
Telecommunications companies established in 2002